Kolkata Knight Riders (KKR) is a franchise cricket team based in Kolkata, India, which plays in the Indian Premier League (IPL). They were one of the eight teams that competed in the 2010 Indian Premier League. They were captained by Sourav Ganguly. Kolkata Knight Riders finished 6th in the IPL and did not qualify for the Champions League T20.

Background 
The Kolkata Knight Riders traded Australian all-rounder Moises Henriques for Manoj Tiwary and Owais Shah. At the Player auctions they managed to successfully buy Shane Bond in the silent tie-breaker against competing bids from Deccan Chargers for $1.3 million. Ganguly was once again given the captaincy of KKR, after the team ended at the bottom in the second season. The coach John Buchanan was replaced by Dav Whatmore.

The Kolkata Knight Riders had a fantastic start to the season with two consecutive wins against Deccan Chargers and Royal Challengers Bangalore. That was followed by three defeats at the hands of Chennai Super Kings, Rajasthan Royals and Mumbai Indians. The Knight Riders then made a comeback by winning most of their homes games against Kings XI Punjab, Deccan Chargers and Delhi Daredevils. Despite being tied at 14-point with The Super Kings, Delhi Daredevils and Royal Challengers Bangalore, a lesser NRR meant they eventually finished sixth on the point table.

Indian Premier League

Season standings
Kolkata Knight Riders finished 6th in the league stage of IPL 2010.

Match log

References

2010 Indian Premier League
Kolkata Knight Riders seasons